The Cyprus Naval Command (also known as the Cyprus Navy or Cypriot Navy) is the armed sea wing of the Cyprus National Guard. 
The Cypriot Navy has the primary mission of defending the maritime borders of the Republic of Cyprus, but is currently unable to access the waters around Northern Cyprus, which have been controlled by the Turkish Navy since the 1974 Turkish invasion of Cyprus.
This force does not possess any capital ships or other major warships, but is equipped with patrol boats, landing craft, surface-to-surface missile systems and integrated radar systems, as well as SEALs-type naval underwater demolitions units.

History

Combat actions of 1964

On 6 August 1964, Cyprus National Guard forces commenced combat action against the Turkish Cypriot enclave of Kokkina, in the north-west of Cyprus. This operation was regarded by both Cyprus and Greece as a necessary interdiction against a threat by Turkish Cypriot militia, who were using Kokkina as a beachhead by which to land supplies and weapons shipped from Turkey. The Cyprus National Guard forces were under the command of General George Grivas, with the blessing of Athens. A combined land and sea attack was launched against Kokkina using two Cyprus Navy R-151 Group patrol boats, the Phaethon (commander - Second Leuthenant Dimitrios Mitsatsos) and the Arion, manned by Greek navy personnel. Firing 40mm and 20mm shells, the two patrol boats bombarded the enclave for a period of time, in conjunction with land-based 25-pounder artillery.

The battle was well underway on 8 August, when the Turkish Air Force commenced its own attack with fighter aircraft, making numerous strafing passes of Greek Cypriot positions. The vessel Phaethon was struck by rocket fire and burst into flames, forcing the crew to deliberately run it aground near Xeros Harbour.  Seven of the crewmembers on Phaethon were killed and several wounded in the attack, and the ship was unsalvageable and later stricken.

The second R-151 Group patrol boat, Arion, was attacked by the same Turkish fighter jet formations, and was reportedly struck several times by strafing fire, but escaped to Paphos. During the attack on the Arion, a Turkish F-100 Super Sabre, piloted by Captain Cengiz Topel, was struck by 40mm anti-aircraft fire and shot down. The pilot ejected over land but was promptly captured and lynched by members of the Cyprus National Guard.

Naval organization in 1970
MTBs flotilla:
 First squadron; base - Boghazi; boats: T-4, T-5, T-6
 Second squadron; base - Kyrenia; boats: T-1, T-2, T-3
 Patrol Boats squadron; base - Boghazi; boats: Leventis, Dedalos
 Four radar stations (range of detection 45 nautical miles)
 Naval stations at Famagusta, Xylophagos, Limassol, Paphos
 Underwater Demolitions Unit (Boghazi naval base)

Cypriot naval vessels from 1964 to 1974

Main armament
  40 mm Bofors Mark III L60 gun
  20 mm Oerlikon Mark 10 L70 cannon
  14,5 mm 2M-5 machine guns
  450 mm type 45-52 torpedoes

Combat actions of 1974

On 15 July 1974, EOKA-B and elements of the Cyprus National Guard overthrew the legitimate President, Archbishop Makarios and replaced him with Nikos Sampson. Makarios escaped an initial attempt to capture him at the Archbishiporic in Nicosia, and fled to Paphos. A naval patrol vessel, Leventis (pennant number 15) was quickly dispatched to Paphos to begin shelling a radio station there which was being operated by pro-Makarios elements.

On 20 July 1974, Turkey invaded Cyprus in a surprise-attack, without issuing a declaration of war. A naval force of Turkish vessels was detected by coastal radar at Apostolos Andreas approaching the coast, and a second force of naval vessels was sighted off the coast of Kyrenia during the early hours. The Cyprus National Guard Naval Command quickly ordered its two motor torpedo boats, T-1 (commander - Lieutenant Junior Grade Nicolaos Verikios) and T-3 (commander - Lieutenant Elefterios Tsomakis), (based at Kyrenia) to attack the Turkish flotilla directly. Both vessels were promptly sunk by combined air and sea attack. The rest of the Cyprus Navy vessels were sunk by their own crews at Naval base "Chrysulis" in Boghazi (14.08.1974). After the conflict, two boats were refloated by Turkish troops and transferred to Golcuk Naval Museum, Turkey (on display with pennant numbers 11 and 12).

Developments from 1975 to 2008
In 1983, the Navy acquired a single Type 32L Esterel fast patrol craft from France. The vessel has been upgraded, and has heavy armament, including two 2-round Mistral-SIMBAD air-defence missile launchers, 1 40mm .70cal OTO-Breda-Bofors AA cannon and 1 20mm .90cal Rheinmetall AA cannon. Later (circa 2006-2008) 40mm .70cal OTO-Breda-Bofors AA cannon was replaced by 20mm .70cal Oerlikon Mk10 AA cannon.

In 1994, Cyprus acquired 24 Aerospatiale MM40 Exocet Block-II anti-ship missiles (reportedly initially intended for Iran) from France, along with 3 coastal defence batteries.

In 2000, the Cyprus Navy received the ex-Hellenic Navy patrol boat "Knossos", which was renamed "Kyrenia", designated P02 and formed the Kyrenia class. This vessel was Greek made, of the Dilos-class, previously designated P269. This vessel is armed with one single 20mm .70cal Oerlikon Mk10 AA cannon and one 2-round Mistral-SIMBAD air-defence missile launcher.

In 2002, the Cyprus Navy acquired two Rodman 55 fast assault boats for the purpose of serving her Special Forces units. These fast craft are named "Agathos" and "Panagos".

During 2004-2006, Cyprus took delivery of four FPB 30M type fast patrol craft from manufacturer Cantierre Navale Vittoria of Italy, of which two were intended for the Navy, and two intended for the Marine Police. These vessels were fitted with single 25mm .80cal KBA OTO-Melara automatic cannons and two single 12.7mm machine guns, equipped with radars and Forward Looking Infra-Red (FLIRs). The Navy pair were issued the pennant numbers P03 and P04.

2011 base disaster

On 11 July 2011, the Evangelos Florakis Naval Base explosion resulted in the destruction of much of the infrastructure of the nation's main naval port and loss of the Commander of Cypriot Navy Captain Andreas Ioannides. Reconstruction began immediately on the strength of domestic contracts for buildings and structures.

Acquisition of new warships

Following various media reports in 2012 that Cyprus was entertaining offers by Israel and Greece to supply two heavy Offshore Patrol Vessels (OPVs), being far larger and more capable than anything previously operated, it was extensively reported in January 2013 that Cyprus signed an agreement with France to purchase two large, stealthy and well-armed vessels based upon the GOWIND corvette design. This frenzy of media speculation was bolstered by the otherwise sudden and unexplained visit to Cyprus by the L'Adroit, which some sources interpreted as a demonstration of the ship design, to be held at Limassol port from 24 to 26 January 2013. Further unconfirmed reports by the Cyprus media claim to have it on good authority that a US$120 million down payment for the vessels is factored into the 2013 fiscal budget, justified against the financial crisis by emergency defense requirements.

On 14 February 2017 a vessel was presented to Cyprus as a gift from the Sultanate of Oman. It was part of the Royal Omani Navy fleet, but was decommissioned and refitted for use in the waters off Cyprus. The ship was renamed Alasia.

On 15 January 2018 the Cyprus Navy commissioned the Commodore Andreas Ioannides P 61, the ship was built by Israel Shipyards Limited and is based on the Saar 4.5 FAC. The navy has an option for an additional vessel which was exercised as of December 2018.

Structure

Equipment

Vessels

Also 2 Italian-made speedboats Poseidonas 1 and Nireas 1.

Main naval base - Evangelos Florakis, Mari - Larnaca

Naval stations - Limassol, Pafos

Naval commanders
 September 2000 – 10 July 2002: Captain Nicholas Georgiou (killed in air accident)
 July 2002 – 20 August 2008: Captain Evangelos Valvis
 20 August 2008 – 11 July 2011: Captain Andreas Ioannides (killed in naval base disaster)
 11 July 2011 – 5 November 2011: Captain George Pitsiakos
 5 November 2011: Captain Kyriakos Pochanis
 2019 –: Rear Admiral Charalambos Charalambous

See also
 Cyprus Joint Rescue Coordination Center
 Cyprus Port & Marine Police
 Evangelos Florakis Naval Base
 List of equipment of the Cypriot National Guard
 Military operations during the Turkish invasion of Cyprus
 Timeline of the Turkish invasion of Cyprus

References

External links
 Cyprus Naval Forces in 1964-1974 (Russian)